The Caney Fork and Western Railroad  is a shortline railroad operating since 1983 from a connection with CSX Transportation at Tullahoma to McMinnville, Tennessee, and ends in Sparta, Tennessee . Currently the railroad is a subsidiary of Ironhorse Resources.
The railroad was originally built by the Memphis & Charleston Railroad. Source: Stone plaque inset into the south pier of the Warren truss bridge over the Caney Fork River at Rock Island, Tennessee, USA.

Principal commodities include lumber, steel, fertilizer, grain, propane,  carbon black, and tires generating approximately 1,350 annual carloads.

References

Tennessee railroads
Railway companies established in 1983
American companies established in 1983